XHZU-FM is a radio station on 97.7 FM in Zacapu, Michoacán. It is owned by Cadena RASA and carries its Candela grupera format.

History
XEZU-AM received its concession on July 26, 1950. It broadcast with 1,000 watts on 1270 kHz. By the 1980s, daytime power had been cut to 500 watts.

In the 1990s, XEZU moved to 930 kHz and raised its power to 1 kW.

XEZU received approval to migrate to FM in 2012.

References

Radio stations in Michoacán